Daqing Radio and Television Tower is a free standing telecommunications tower built in 1989 in Daqing, China. The tower is  260 m (853 ft) tall.

See also  
 Lattice tower
 List of towers

References

Towers completed in 1989
Buildings and structures in Heilongjiang
Towers in China
Lattice towers